Fratta may refer to:

Places

Italy
Municipalities (comuni)
Fratta Polesine, in the Province of Rovigo, Veneto
Fratta Todina, in the Province of Perugia, Umbria
Frattamaggiore, in the Province of Naples, Campania
Frattaminore, in the Province of Naples, Campania
Valera Fratta, in the Province of Lodi, Lombardy

Civil parishes (frazioni)
Fratta (Caneva), in the municipality of Caneva (PN), Friuli-Venezia Giulia
Fratta (Cortona), in the municipality of Cortona (AR), Tuscany
Fratta (Fontaniva), in the municipality of Fontaniva (PD), Veneto
Fratta (Fossalta di Portogruaro), in the municipality of Fossalta di Portogruaro (VE), Veneto
Fratta (Maniago), in the municipality of Maniago (PN), Friuli-Venezia Giulia
Fratta (Montefalco), in the municipality of Montefalco (PG), Umbria
Fratta (Oderzo), in the municipality of Oderzo (TV), Veneto
Fratta (Romans d'Isonzo), in the municipality of Romans d'Isonzo (GO), Friuli-Venezia Giulia
Fratta (Rotonda), frazione del comune di Rotonda (PZ), Basilicata
Fratta (Tarzo), in the municipality of Tarzo (TV), Veneto
Fratta Terme, in the municipality of Bertinoro (FC), Emilia-Romagna
Frattaguida, in the municipality of Parrano (TR), Umbria
Frattavecchia, in the municipality of Castiglione del Lago (PG), Umbria
La Fratta, in the municipality of Sinalunga (SI), Tuscany

San Marino
Fratta or Cesta, one of the three towers of the City of San Marino

People with the surname
Domenico Maria Fratta (1696–1763), Italian painter and engraver

See also
Fratte (disambiguation)

Italian-language surnames